Karaj and Suburbs Bus Organization is a public transport agency running Transit buses in Karaj and surrounding cities in Alborz Province.

References

Transport in Iran
Karaj
Transportation in Alborz Province
Bus transport in Iran